The Jacoby transfer, or simply transfers, in the card game contract bridge, is a convention in most bridge bidding systems initiated by responder following partner's notrump opening bid that forces opener to rebid in the  just above that bid by responder. For example, a response in diamonds forces a rebid in hearts and a response in hearts forces a rebid in spades. Transfers are used to show a long suit, usually a major, and to ensure that opener  the hand if the final contract is in the suit transferred to, preventing the opponents from seeing the cards of the stronger hand.

The use of the 2 and 2 (and often 2) responses to an opening 1NT bid as transfers is one of the most widely employed conventions in the game. Less commonly, partnerships may agree to use transfer-style bids in a variety of other situations.

History and purpose
First described in a series of articles by Olle Willner of Sweden in Bridge Tidningen in the early 1950s, transfers were popularized for English speakers in 1956 in The Bridge World article by Oswald Jacoby and have gained widespread international acceptance by duplicate and rubber bridge players alike. In the article, Jacoby gave his name to the convention as the Jacoby Transfer Bid (JTB) stating that it was an adaptation of a bid then known variously as either the 'Texas Convention' or the 'Carter Transfer' (now known as the Texas transfer).

The initial purpose of the convention was to make the notrump opener the declarer in a suit contract when his partner held a relatively weak hand with a long suit; this would make the opening lead come up to the stronger hand and such a situation is advantageous should declarer possess one or more  or tenuously guarded honors. In addition, the exchange of information by the transfer bid and subsequent rebids by responder and notrump opener "is designed to help partnerships reach the right contract", i.e. their optimum contract.

In the 1990s further developments of the transfer procedures enabled them to be used to even greater effect. The use of "bouncing" and "breaking" rebids by opener offered partnerships the opportunity to find safe game and slam contracts with fewer high card points than with traditional methods.

Initial transfer bid 
The transfer procedure is quite simple and is described first in response to your partner's 1NT opening bid. Since a 1NT opening bid requires a balanced hand, i.e. no more than one doubleton, it promises to have at least two cards in the desired suit:
 Holding a 5-card major suit, responder would traditionally bid two, three or four of that suit depending on strength; using transfers, responder will instead bid two of the suit below the major suit
 Partner (opener) must then bid two of the next suit up (i.e. the major suit in question)
 Examples:
 1NT - 2 (i.e., "I have a 5-card heart suit, please bid my suit") - opener must rebid 2
 1NT - 2 (i.e., "I have a 5-card spade suit, please bid my suit.") - opener must rebid 2
Opener can super-accept the transfer by bidding three of the major with a maximum hand containing at least four cards in that major.

An immediate disadvantage of this method is that it is incompatible with a weak take out into 2, although as with the loss of the 2 weak take-out when using Stayman, this is not generally considered a serious loss.

Subsequent standard bids 
After the transfer has been completed by the 1NT opener, subsequent bids by the transfer initiator are:
 Weak hands
 Pass, to play a partial game in the transferred suit
 Invitational hands
 2NT, giving the strong partner the option of continuing to game or playing a partial game, in either no trump or the transferred suit
 three of the transferred suit, promising a six-card suit
 Game strength hands
 New suit, showing 5-4 or 5-5 and game forcing
 3NT, allowing opener a choice of 3NT or four of the major
 four in the transferred suit, to play promising a six-card suit

Non-standard but common subsequent bids 
Since a 2 response is no longer required for a weak take-out into spades, it is often used in other ways:
 In SAYC, the 2 response is used to sign off in either minor at the 3-level. It forces opener to bid 3:
 1NT - 2 - 3 - Pass with a weak hand with at least six clubs.
 1NT - 2 - 3 - 3 with a weak hand with at least six diamonds.
 Simple use of the 2 response is to split the traditional 2NT response in a precise HCP way e.g. for Acol (1NT = 12-14 HCP):
 1NT - 2 = I have a balanced hand and exactly 11 HCP
 1NT - 2NT = I have a balanced hand and exactly 12 HCP
 This has been further refined to include the use of the 2 bid as a means of transferring into a minor suit, thus for Acol:
 1NT - 2 = I may have 11 HCP or I may have a long minor suit. Opener rebids:
 2NT with a weak hand (i.e. 12 HCP) - partner then chooses between passing or bidding a minor suit.
 3 with a strong hand (14 HCP) - partner then chooses between 3NT, passing or bidding diamonds.
 2 may also be used as a Baron range enquiry, to find whether opener is minimum or maximum, if responder has 11-12 points (looking for game in NT) or 17-20 points (looking for slam in NT or a minor)
 An alternative method of minor suit transfers is to use 2 as a transfer to clubs and 3 (or 2NT) as a transfer to diamonds.

Modern additions to transfer procedures 
Although part of the early writings on transfers in the 1950s, "bouncing" and "breaking" have only become widespread in the UK since the 1990s.  As promulgated by Paul Mendelson, they are:
 Bouncing (also known as bypassing). Following the standard initiation of a transfer sequence (e.g. 1NT - 2 - ?).
 Opener rebids 3 with a maximum point count (14 with Acol) and 4-card support for hearts.
 With all other hands, opener rebids 2.
 Breaking. Following the same initial sequence of 1NT - 2 - ?:
 Opener rebids three of an unexpected suit (3) to show maximum points (14 with Acol) and a poor doubleton (xx) in the bid suit (e.g. diamonds)
With these two devices (bouncing and breaking) it is possible to discover, at very little risk, games that would otherwise be missed.

Using transfers in other NT situations 
Transfers work well following other notrump bids. A common usage follows an opening bid of 2NT where a weak take-out into three of a major becomes a possibility whereas with traditional methods such a bid would be forcing.

Transfers following a double 
Following a double (i.e. partner opens 1NT and intervening opponent doubles), there are two options in fairly common use:
 Transfers and Stayman become inoperative, i.e. all 2-level bids are for take-out. This has the advantage of simplicity but the disadvantage that the stronger hand becomes dummy with a resultant offering of information to opponents, though conversely responder's hand which could have a wide range of possible strengths is completely concealed from opponents.
 All 2-level bids become transfers according to this scheme (known as "exit transfers" in some quarters):
 redouble transfers to 2.
 2 transfers to 2.
 2 transfers to 2.
 2 transfers to 2.
 2 (Acol - I have 11 HCP) transfers to NT at the appropriate level.
 2NT (Acol - I have 12 HCP)
(Note: some partnerships use a "forcing pass" by the partner of the 1NT opener. The 1NT opener is then obliged to redouble. The partner of the 1NT opener may then pass the redouble with a good hand and 1NT redoubled is judged to be makeable, or with a poor hand initiate bidding 4-card suits up-the-line until at least at 4-3 suit fit is found).

Transfers following an intervening bid 
Standard bidding in most systems is that all responses following a natural suit overcall are themselves natural bids ("double" may be used for take-out). An alternative is that such responses, including "double", act as transfers. For example, following a 1NT opening and a 2 overcall:
double ... transfer to hearts
2 ... transfer to spades
2 ... transfer to clubs

References

Further reading 
Standard applications of the Jacoby transfer are fully described in Standard American 21 by John Sheridan Thomas.
Paul Mendelson. Mendelson's Guide to the Bidding Battle, 1998. Colt Books, Cambridge, England. . Reprinted 2003 as Control the Bidding, Elliot Right Way Books, .

Bridge conventions